Mount Bwahit (or Buahit, Bachit, Buiheat) is a peak of the Simien Mountains in the Amhara Region of Ethiopia. Its altitude is estimated at 4430 or 4437 m above sea level, making it the third highest mountain in Ethiopia and the 13th or 14th highest mountain of Africa. It is located about 16 km west of the highest Ethiopian mountain, Ras Dashen, from which it is separated by a 1,600 m deep gorge. The connecting ridge goes NNE over the Arkwasiye Pass (ca. 3635 m), eastwards over Kidis Yared, at  the second-highest mountain in Ethiopia, and SSE over the Metelal Pass at approximately 3730 metres above mean sea level to Ras Dashen.

References

Simien Mountains
Mountains of Ethiopia